Muellerites is a genus of fungi in the class Dothideomycetes. The relationship of this taxon to other taxa within the class is unknown (incertae sedis). A monotypic genus, it contains the single species Muellerites juniperi.

The genus name of Muellerites is in honour of Emil Müller (1920–2008), who was a Swiss mycologist.

The genus was circumscribed by Lennart Holm in Svensk Bot. Tidskr. vol.62 on page 231 in 1968.

See also 
 List of Dothideomycetes genera incertae sedis

References

External links 
 Index Fungorum

Monotypic Dothideomycetes genera
Dothideomycetes enigmatic taxa